Lagerstroemia calyculata known as the "Guava Crape Myrtle" (Vietnamese name : Bằng Lăng Ổi, Bằng Lăng Cườm;  tabaek; Cambodian name: Srolao "ដើមស្រឡៅ"); the name is derived from its very characteristic mottled flaky bark. It is a species of flowering plant in the family Lythraceae and found in Southeast Asia and Oceania.

It is a medium-sized tree growing up to a height between 10 and 20 m. Like other species of the same genus, it is quite common as a decorative tree in the parks of Thailand owing to its beautiful bunches of pink flowers. Its wood has a low commercial value, which is why it thought to have maintained the forest structure in previously logged parts of Cat Tien National Park, where it may constitute >25% of tree counts.

References

External links

Lagerstroemia

calyculata
Trees of Indo-China
Flora of Malaya